John Mahoney (1940–2018) was an English-American actor.

John Mahoney may also refer to:
John Mahoney (footballer) (born 1946), Welsh international footballer
John Christopher Mahoney (1882–1952), United States federal judge
John Francis Mahoney (1884–1929), Canadian lawyer and political figure
John Friend Mahoney (1889–1957), American physician
John J. Mahoney, member of the Massachusetts House of Representatives since 2011
John Mahoney (Ohio politician) (1949–2011), member of the Ohio Senate
John W. Mahoney (1926–2006), lawyer, judge and politician in Newfoundland, Canada
J. Daniel Mahoney (1931–1996), judge of the United States Court of Appeals
John Mahony (ethicist) (born 1931), Scottish Jesuit and moral theologian
John C. Mahoney (mayor) (1881–1946), American mayor

See also 
John Mahony (1863–1943), Irish sportsman
John Keefer Mahony (1911–1990), Canadian Victoria Cross recipient
Jack Mahoney (disambiguation)